Liu Yin (born 5 September 1984) is a Chinese former butterfly and medley swimmer who competed in the 2000 Summer Olympics.

References

1984 births
Living people
Chinese female butterfly swimmers
Chinese female medley swimmers
Olympic swimmers of China
Swimmers at the 2000 Summer Olympics
Asian Games medalists in swimming
Swimmers at the 2002 Asian Games
Asian Games bronze medalists for China
Medalists at the 2002 Asian Games
21st-century Chinese women